Oblakovo is a village in the Bitola Municipality of North Macedonia. It used to be part of the former municipality of Kukurečani.

Demographics
According to the 2002 census, the village had a total of 1 inhabitant. Ethnic groups in the village include:

Macedonians 1

References

External links
Visit Macedonia

Villages in Bitola Municipality